Paman may refer to:
 Paman languages, an Australian language family
Paman, Kanpur Dehat, village in Uttar Pradesh, India
Paman, Sultanpur Lodhi, village in Punjab, India
Perman (manga), also known as Pāman

People with the surname
Clement Paman (died 1664), English poet and clergyman
Henry Paman, (1626–1695), English physician
Roger Paman (c.1700-1748), English mathematician